Bab El-Oued City is a 1994 Algerian drama film directed by Merzak Allouache. It was screened in the Un Certain Regard section at the 1994 Cannes Film Festival, where it won the FIPRESCI Award.

Plot
Boualem is a baker's boy who works early mornings and sleeps during the day. One day, the imam's prayer is boosted to full volume through Bab El-Oued's loud speakers, leading Boualem to tear out one of those speakers and throw it in the sea. The Islamic authorities of the city launch a manhunt for the perpetrator.

Cast
 Nadia Kaci - Yamina
 Mohamed Ourdache - Said
 Hassan Abidou - Boualem
 Mabrouk Ait Amara - Mabrouk
 Messaoud Hattau - Mess
 Mourad Khen - Rachid
  - Lalla Djamila
 Simone Vignote - The aunt
 Michel Such - Paulo Gosen
 Nadia Samir - Ouardya
 Areski Nebti - Hassan the baker
 Osmane Bechikh - The postman
 Fawzi B. Saichi - The shoemender
 Fatma Zohra Bouseboua - Hanifa
 Ahmed Benaissa - The Imam

References

External links
 
 

1994 films
1990s Arabic-language films
1994 drama films
Films directed by Merzak Allouache
Algerian drama films
Films about Islam